Balaustion is a monotypic genus of flowering plants in the myrtle family, Myrtaceae. The sole species is Balaustion pulcherrimum, commonly known as the native pomegranate, which is endemic to Western Australia.

A formerly included species, Balaustion microphyllum, is currently placed in the genus Cheyniana, as Cheyniana microphylla.

References

Myrtaceae
Monotypic Myrtaceae genera
Myrtales of Australia
Endemic flora of Western Australia
Taxa named by William Jackson Hooker